Belfast Falls was a constituency of the Parliament of Northern Ireland.

Boundaries
Belfast Falls was a borough constituency comprising part of western Belfast. It was created in 1929, when the House of Commons (Method of Voting and Redistribution of Seats) Act (Northern Ireland) 1929 introduced first-past-the-post elections throughout Northern Ireland.

Belfast Falls was created by the division of Belfast West into four new constituencies. It was formed from the Falls ward and included the Falls Road. It survived unchanged, returning one member of Parliament, until the Parliament of Northern Ireland was temporarily suspended in 1972, and then formally abolished in 1973.

Politics
The constituency was the most staunchly nationalist in Belfast. It was initially held by Nationalist Party members, then later by a variety of labour movement activists and members of smaller nationalist parties.

Members of Parliament

Election results 

 Death of Byrne

References

Falls
Northern Ireland Parliament constituencies established in 1929
Northern Ireland Parliament constituencies disestablished in 1973